Dương Thị Thanh Minh (born 4 May 1992) is a Vietnamese female ju-jitsu practitioner who also formerly competed as a judoka in international competitive events. She represented Vietnam at the 2010 Asian Games as a judoka and competed in the women's 52kg event.

She represented Vietnam at the 2018 Asian Games as a ju-jitsu practitioner and claimed a bronze medal in the women's 62kg ne-waza event.

References 

1992 births
Living people
Vietnamese female martial artists
Vietnamese female judoka
Judoka at the 2010 Asian Games
Ju-jitsu practitioners at the 2018 Asian Games
Medalists at the 2018 Asian Games
Asian Games bronze medalists for Vietnam
Asian Games medalists in ju-jitsu
Southeast Asian Games bronze medalists for Vietnam
Southeast Asian Games medalists in judo
Competitors at the 2011 Southeast Asian Games
21st-century Vietnamese women
Competitors at the 2021 Southeast Asian Games
People from Thừa Thiên-Huế province